Pleocoma dubitabilis is a species of rain beetle in the family Pleocomidae. It is found in North America.

Subspecies
These two subspecies belong to the species Pleocoma dubitabilis:
 Pleocoma dubitabilis dubitabilis Davis, 1935
 Pleocoma dubitabilis leachi Linsley, 1938

References

Further reading

 

Scarabaeiformia
Articles created by Qbugbot
Beetles described in 1935